Aled Watkin Owen (7 January 1934 – 5 August 2022) was a Welsh professional footballer who played as a winger for Bangor City, Tottenham Hotspur, Ipswich Town and Wrexham.

Career 
Owen began his football career at non-league Bangor City. He joined Tottenham Hotspur in September 1953. He made one senior appearance for the Lilies in a 6–2 reverse against Preston North End on 19 April 1954 at White Hart Lane, the club's equal heaviest defeat at home against the Lancashire club. Owen transferred to Ipswich Town in July 1958 and went on to feature in 30 matches and netting three goals for the Portman Road club. He joined Wrexham in July 1963 where he appeared in a further three fixtures.

Death 
Owen died on 5 August 2022, at the age of 88.

References

External links 
 Aled Owen profile at Ipswich Town Talk
 

1934 births
2022 deaths
Sportspeople from Anglesey
Welsh footballers
Association football wingers
English Football League players
Bangor City F.C. players
Tottenham Hotspur F.C. players
Ipswich Town F.C. players
Wrexham A.F.C. players